The Battle of Four Lakes was a battle during the Coeur d'Alene War of 1858 in the Washington Territory (now the states of Washington and Idaho) in the United States. The Coeur d'Alene War was part of the Yakima War, which began in 1855. The battle was fought near present-day Four Lakes, Washington, between elements of the United States Army and a coalition of Native American tribes consisting of Schitsu'umsh (Coeur d'Alene), Palus, Spokan, and Yakama warriors.

Background
Schitsu'umsh lands were protected by treaty, and the tribe was outraged by miners and illegal white settlers invading their territory. They also perceived the Mullan Road, whose construction had just begun near Fort Dalles, as a precursor to a land-grab by the United States. Two white miners were killed, and the U.S. Army decided to retaliate. The Coeur d'Alene War (the last part of the larger Yakima War) began with the Battle of Pine Creek (near present-day Rosalia, Washington) on May 17, 1858, during which a column of 164 U.S. Army infantry and cavalry under the command of brevet Lieutenant Colonel Edward Steptoe was routed by a group composed primarily of Cayuse, Schitsu'umsh, Spokan, and Yakama warriors.

Following Steptoe's defeat, Colonel George Wright, commander of Fort Dalles, led a much larger unit of 500 Army soldiers, 200 civilian drovers, and 30 Niimíipu (or Nez Perce) scouts to nearby Fort Walla Walla and then north to the Spokane Plains (near modern-day Spokane, Washington). Wright's troops were armed with the new Springfield Model 1855 rifle-musket. They also had five times the range of the weapons (bow and arrow and musket) used by the Native Americans. Wright's men also carried two  howitzers and two  cannon.

Battle

The Native Americans, who numbered about 500 in total, planned to lure Wright's cavalry over the ridge and onto the plains beyond, where their faster mounts and superior horsemanship would enable them to wipe out the mounted soldiers. This would leave Wright's infantry stranded, incapable of resupply and thus easy prey. Chief Kamiakin occupied the center with Palus and Yakama. On the Indian left were Kamiakin's nephew, Qualchan, with additional Yakamas, and Stellam, a chief of the Schitsu'umsh, with warriors of his tribe. On the right were the Spokan chief Polatkin and members of his tribe.

Wright attacked with a group of 30 Niimíipu led by 1st Lt. John Mullan, who swept far to the right and then behind the ridge, forcing the Indians atop it to withdraw.  Wright then sent his infantry up and over the ridge.  The infantry line stopped  from the Native American forces, who (based on their previous experience with Steptoe) believed themselves safely out of range. The infantry opened fire, killing a number of Native Americans and scattering most of them.  Then Wright's cavalary sped around the ridge to the left, driving into the main Native American force, scattering more of them and driving many into the woods on Wright's right. Wright's artillery, brought up to the ridge, fired into the trees.

The battle lasted until 2 P.M. No Army personnel were lost, while Native American casualties numbered 17 to 20 dead and several times that number wounded. Although Wright's cavalry pursued the Indians, their slower mounts, laden with much more gear, soon tired and the Army could not keep up the chase.

Kamiakin had counted on another Army defeat to rally more tribes and warriors to his cause and vastly enlarging his alliance. The defeat at Four Lakes meant no such allies emerged, effectively ending the uprising (although one more battle remained to be fought).

References

Bibliography

Further reading
U.S. Army defeats Native Americans at Battle of Four Lakes on September 1, 1858 at HistoryLink.org

Four Lakes
Four Lakes
Washington Territory
History of Spokane, Washington
1858 in Washington Territory
September 1858 events